Bjørn Andersen may refer to:
Bjørn G. Andersen (1924–2012), Norwegian geologist and glaciologist
Bjørn Bang Andersen (born 1937), Norwegian shot putter
Bjørn Odmar Andersen (1943–2008), Norwegian footballer
Alice Bjorn Andersen, Danish beauty queen in Miss International 1964
Bjørn Andersen, Danish table tennis player, winner of Denmark Open in 1968–69
Henrik B. Andersen (Henrik Bjørn Andersen, born 1958), Danish sculptor
Bjørn Willberg Andersen, Norwegian actor in 1994 frama film Dreamplay
Jens Bjørn Andersen, CEO of DSV since 2008
  (born 1944)
Bjørn Andersen (pole vaulter) (born 1931), Danish Olympic athlete

See also 
 (born 1954), Danish actress, nominated for Bodil Award for Best Actress in a Leading Role in 1996, played in 2001 film One-Hand Clapping and 2005 film Dark Horse
Niels Bjørn-Andersen, winner of Leo award in 2006, see Association for Information Systems
Bjorn Anderson (disambiguation)